"England Swings" is a 1965 country music song written and performed by Roger Miller. The single was Miller's eleventh hit on the US country chart where it peaked at number three. On the Billboard Hot 100, it peaked at number eight and was Miller's second number one on the Easy Listening chart. Petula Clark (from the Colour My World album) and Pat Boone both released cover versions in 1967.

The title refers to Swinging London, a popular term for the youth-centric cultural scene in London at the time, as in the opening line of the refrain: "England Swings,  like a pendulum do". The lyrics, however, mostly relate to traditional notions of Britain, with references to "bobbies on bicycles", Westminster Abbey and Big Ben, plus, the "Rosy-red cheeks of the little children."  The song also provides the structure for Miller's later song "Oo De Lally (Robin Hood and Little John)" for the film Robin Hood. The song is featured in the 2012 BBC documentary How The Brits Rocked America, in which Miller is presented as mocking the youth culture. Miller sang his own harmony and did his own harmonic whistling on the song.

Cover versions and renditions
The song was covered by The Wiggles and Keith Urban on the Australian version of the album Let's Eat, released in 2010.

Chart history

See also
List of number-one adult contemporary singles of 1966 (U.S.)

References

1965 singles
1965 songs
Roger Miller songs
Smash Records singles
Song recordings produced by Jerry Kennedy
Songs about England
Songs written by Roger Miller